Elmer Goodfellow "El" Brendel  (March 25, 1890 – April 9, 1964) was an American vaudeville comedian turned movie star, best remembered for his dialect routine as a Swedish immigrant. His biggest role was as "Single-0" in the sci-fi musical Just Imagine (1930), produced by Fox Film Corporation. His screen name was pronounced "El Bren-DEL".

Early life
He was born on March 25, 1890 in Philadelphia, Pennsylvania to an Irish mother and German immigrant father. Brendel, unlike his stage and film character, was not Swedish. He spoke standard American English without a trace of any other accent. He attended the University of Pennsylvania.

He entered vaudeville in 1913 as a German dialect comedian and married his vaudeville partner. Due to anti-German sentiment brought about by the sinking of the RMS Lusitania, Brendel developed a new character, one he would portray on stage and in films for the rest of his career: a good-natured, simple Swede, often called "Oley," "Ole," or "Ollie". 

During the 1910s and early 1920s, he appeared with his wife, vaudeville star Flo Bert, doing a married-couple routine. It was during this period that he coined his trademark lines, "Yee vizz!" and "Yumpin' yiminy!" He made his first stage appearance in 1921. He appeared in Cinderella on Broadway, Spice of 1922, Passing Show, and New York Whirl.

Career

In 1926, he signed a contract with Famous Players Film Company and appeared in eight films there over the next two years, most memorably as the comic relief in Wings (1927) with Clara Bow and Buddy Rogers, a film which won the first Academy Award for Outstanding Production (an award that is comparable to today's Best Picture Oscar.)  Brendel played the character Herman Schwimpf, a German-American whose patriotism is at first questioned when he volunteers for service in the U.S. Air Force.

Brendel left Paramount Pictures in 1927 to return to the vaudeville stage before being coaxed back to Hollywood in 1929, signing a contract with Fox Film Corporation. His star immediately rose at the studio, largely in part due to the advent of sound. His "simple Swede" character now had a voice, and his malaprop-ridden dialogue gave his character new appeal. He was featured in the boisterous "Quirt and Flagg" military comedies with Edmund Lowe and Victor McLaglen. 

After finishing production of Sunny Side Up with Janet Gaynor, Brendel was the star comedian in New Movietone Follies of 1930, The Big Trail with John Wayne, and the Gershwin musical Delicious with Gaynor, which introduced the song "New York Rhapsody" and featured Brendel's rendition of "Blah Blah Blah". In 1930 Brendel starred in Just Imagine, a science fiction musical directed by David Butler. 

In 1931 Fox starred him in the dual roles of Mr. Lemon and Silent McGee in the comedy Mr. Lemon of Orange.  While Mr. Lemon of Orange was publicized by Fox as Brendel's first starring role, that distinction is more accurately given to Just Imagine, which was released five months earlier. Brendel was the most popular comedian in America at the time, according to author Richard Barrios.

Despite the positive public reception of Just Imagine and Mr. Lemon of Orange, it was judged that Brendel could not carry an expensive film. He continued to play leads in B-pictures, but served in more prestigious fare mainly in supporting roles, mostly with his trademark Swedish accent. In 1933, he left Fox and had a brief tenure at Warner Bros. Studios making two-reelers, and for the next few years, was a freelance actor. His former director David Butler cast him in two major features, Little Miss Broadway with Shirley Temple, and If I Had My Way co-starring Bing Crosby and Gloria Jean.

In 1936, El Brendel made his debut at Columbia Pictures in a pair of two-reel comedies; producer Jules White liked Brendel's act and hired him for a series in 1941. Brendel was a popular attraction in short subjects (Columbia billed him as "America's Swede-Heart!") and he was often paired with other well-known comedians, including Shemp Howard, Harry Langdon, Tom Kennedy, and Monty Collins. Brendel also starred in feature films for the independent PRC studio. When his PRC and Columbia work ran out in 1945, Brendel went back to vaudeville, returning to the screen only occasionally. One of his last films was The Beautiful Blonde from Bashful Bend (1949), starring Betty Grable.

In 1950, Brendel recorded four numbers for Imperial Records: Frankie And Johnny, Hulda, Pinch Of Snoose and Yumpin' Yiminy (a loose adaptation of the 1918 song Holy Yumpin Yimini).

During the 1950s, he shared a brief revival with his wife, Flo Bert, on television variety shows, including You Asked For It with Art Baker. He also appeared in a few television series such as Cowboy G-Men, My Little Margie, and Perry Mason. His last film was Laffing Time (1959), a featherweight, sitcom-styled comedy. Producer Edward Finney took the leading role, with Gloria Jean as the feminine lead, and Mr. and Mrs. Brendel as neighbors. He also recorded narration for a proposed children's-television project; some of this footage appears in Finney's feature film Tobo the Happy Clown.

Death
El Brendel died of a heart attack at the Hollywood Presbyterian Hospital in Hollywood, California on April 9, 1964. He is buried at the Hollywood Forever Cemetery.

Partial filmography 
El Brendel films may be viewed at the Internet Archive and other video-sharing websites  or purchased from online retailers.

Feature films and short subjects in which El Brendel appeared:

 You Never Know Women (1926) - Toberchik
 The Campus Flirt (1926) - Knute Knudson
 Man of the Forest (1926) - Horace Pipp
 Too Many Crooks (1927) - Botts
 Arizona Bound (1927) - 'Oley Smoke' Oleson
 Wings (1927) - Herman Schwimpf
 Rolled Stockings (1927) - Rudolph
 Ten Modern Commandments (1927) - 'Speeding' Shapiro
 The Cock-Eyed World (1929) - 'Yump' Olson
 Happy Days (1929) - Minstrel Show Performer #2
 Frozen Justice (1929) - Swede
 Hot for Paris (1929) - Axel Olson
 Sunny Side Up (1929) - Eric Swenson
 The Golden Calf (1930) - Knute Olson
 New Movietone Follies of 1930 (1930) - Alex Svenson
 The Big Trail (1930) - Gus
 Just Imagine (1930) - Single O
 Mr. Lemon of Orange (1931) - Oscar Lemon / Silent McGee
 Six Cylinder Love (1931) - Janitor
 Women of All Nations (1931) - Olsen
 The Spider (1931) - Ole
 West of Broadway (1931) - Axel 'Swede' Axelson
 Delicious (1931) - Chris Jansen
 Disorderly Conduct (1932) - Olsen
 Handle with Care (1932) - Carl Lundstrom
 Born to Fight (1932) - Swiebach
 Olsen's Big Moment (1933) - Knute Olsen
 Hot Pepper (1933) - Olsen
 The Last Trail (1933) - Newt Olsen
 My Lips Betray (1933) - Oswald Stigmat, Chauffeur
 The Meanest Gal in Town (1934) - Chris Peterson
 What, No Men! (1935, Short) - Gus Olsen - Gas Company Representative
 Career Woman (1936) - Chris Erleson
 God's Country and the Woman (1937) - Ole Olson
 The Holy Terror (1937) - 'Bugs' Svenson
 Blonde Trouble (1937) - Window Washer
 Happy Landing (1938) - Yonnie
 Little Miss Broadway (1938) - Ole
 Valley of the Giants (1938) - 'Fats'
 Risky Business (1939) - Axel
 Code of the Streets (1939) - Mickhail 'Micky' Bjorgulfsen
 The House of Fear (1939) - Jeff
 Call a Messenger (1939) - 'Baldy'
 If I Had My Way (1940) - Axel Swenson
 Captain Caution (1940) - Slushy
 Gallant Sons (1940) - Olaf Larsen
 Phoney Cronies (1942, Short) - Oley
 Machine Gun Mama (1944) - Ollie Swenson
 I'm from Arkansas (1944) - Oly
 Pistol Packin' Nitwits (1945, Short) - Professor Brendel
 The Beautiful Blonde from Bashful Bend (1949) - Mr. Jorgensen
 Paris Model (1953) - Papa Jensen
 The She-Creature (1956) - Olaf
 Laffing Time (1959) - Efrem "Blobbsy" Blobbs

See also

Scandinavian dialect humor

References

External links

Streaming audio
 El Brendel
Sheet music cover
 Yonny And His Oompah: performed by El Brendel in Happy Landing (1938)

1890 births
1964 deaths
20th-century American male actors
20th Century Studios contract players
American people of Irish descent
American male film actors
American male silent film actors
American male stage actors
Burials at Hollywood Forever Cemetery
Paramount Pictures contract players
Male actors from Philadelphia
Vaudeville performers
American people of German descent
University of Pennsylvania alumni